"Wolf 359" is an episode of the original The Outer Limits television show. It first aired on 7 November 1964, during the second season. The title is derived from a star of the same name located relatively near Earth.

Introduction
The speedy evolution of an alien culture is observed through a professor's telescope. However, the experience soon goes out of control when a malevolent lifeform evolves at the planet's surface and threatens the scientific team.

Opening narration
Outward stretches the quest for truth. Stars without end. Timeless infinities. A billion, billion galaxies. Man's imagination reaches out and out, while betimes the farthest reaches of knowledge are found in the smallest places...

Plot
Working on behalf of corporate interests, scientist Jonathan Meridith has created a miniature version of a remote planet (in the titular Wolf 359 system) in his laboratory. Due to the miniaturization, this artificial world knows an accelerated development, thus allowing Meridith to study its evolution through an electronic microscope, and to observe the birth of archaic life forms on its surface. However, soon a mysterious lifeform evolves along with the developing experiment. It is aware of the scientist's presence—even acting aggressively toward him at some point. Manifesting by night in the absence of light, the creature takes a physical shape into the laboratory itself, destroying all life inside it, including plants, a colony of ants and a couple of guinea pigs. Becoming aware of the situation, Meridith weighs the value of his experiment versus the possible dangers. He resorts to firing his lab assistant and sending his wife back home, in order to keep them away from harm. Pursuing his studies, the scientist soon discovers the creature inhabiting the planet seems to be a manifestation of the planet itself, similar to its collective mind, and bent on destruction. As the evolution of the miniature world progresses, Meridith observes a reproduction of the darkest moments of Earth's history at its surface (including the development of nuclear weapons). Lowering his guard one night, the scientist is suddenly attacked by the creature; he is, however, saved by his wife. She returns from home at the right moment to breach the miniature planet's containment cell, causing its atmosphere to escape so that the creature is destroyed along with the planet. In the epilogue, Meridith can be seen recording his final report on Wolf 359, saying that the experiment is over and the planet destroyed. Yet he also mentions that the experience could be successfully recreated in the future, if only one could find a better planet.

Closing narration
There is a theory that Earth and sun and galaxy and all the known universes are only a dust mote on some policeman's uniform in some gigantic superworld. Couldn't we be under some supermicroscope, right now?

Cast
 Patrick O'Neal – as Jonathan Meridith
 Sara Shane – as Ethel Meridith
 Peter Haskell – as Peter Jellicoe
 Ben Wright – as Philip Exeter Dundee
 Dabney Coleman – as James Custer

References

External links

The Outer Limits (1963 TV series season 2) episodes
1964 American television episodes
Fiction set around Wolf 359